Adam Neylon (born December 30, 1984) is an American small business owner and Republican politician.  He is a member of the Wisconsin State Assembly, representing central Waukesha County.

Background
Neylon was born in Elgin, Illinois, and raised in West Dundee, Illinois. He attended and graduated from Harry D. Jacobs High School in Algonquin, Illinois. After high school, he attended Carroll University and graduated with a degree in political science in 2008. At Carroll, he played second base on the baseball team.

After college, Neylon entered into Wisconsin politics by serving as a member of The Sensenbrenner Committee Primary Campaign Staff (2008), as an Absentee Ballot Director for the Republican National Committee (2008), as a Congressional Staff member for the Office of Congressman Jim Sensenbrenner (2008-2010), as the Waukesha County Field Director for the Republican Party of Wisconsin (2010), and as a Policy Advisor for the Wisconsin State Assembly (2011-2012).

In 2010, Neylon opened his own commercial window cleaning company. On April 2, 2013, in a special election, Neylon was elected to the Wisconsin State Assembly's 98th District as a Republican from Waukesha County, Wisconsin. In 2014 and 2016, Neylon ran for re-election and won.

Neylon lives in Pewaukee, Wisconsin with his wife Hannah and their daughter Elizabeth Grace and son Thomas Robert.

Career
In his first run for elected office, Neylon won a special election Republican primary for the 98th Assembly District in Wisconsin on February 19, 2013. He ran unopposed in the general election. After the election, the conservative website Right Wisconsin said Neylon was poised to become a rising star in Madison.
 
During the 2013-15 state budget debate, he championed issues like tax cuts, reduced long-term borrowing, and fought against DNA collection upon arrest. According to journalist Steven Walters, he was one of the GOP Young Guns that helped dictate final budget deals. 
 
Neylon was selected to receive the Bowhay Institute for Legislative Leadership Development fellowship with the Council of State Governments in 2014. In his first term, Neylon was part of the class of 2014, making him the only freshman Republican selected from Wisconsin that year. Neylon has been serving as Chairman of the Assembly Committee on Jobs and the Economy and Chairman of Wisconsin's Small Business Regulatory Review Board since 2015.

During the 2015-2016 Wisconsin Legislative Session, four bills authored by Neylon were passed and signed into law. These bills are the GPS Privacy Act, The Parent-Based School Accountability Act, the Wisconsin Robotics League Participation Grant Program, and the Department of Children and Families Modernization Act. The GPS Privacy Act protects citizens by making it a crime for someone to place a global positioning system (GPS) device on someone's vehicle without their consent. The Parent-Based School Accountability Act requires Wisconsin schools to post a link on their website to the School Report Card generated by the Wisconsin Department of Public Instruction. The Wisconsin Robotics League Participation Grant Program is a participation grant program, where schools are able to apply for up to $5000 in grants to help pay the cost of having a school affiliated robotics team.

During the 2017-18 Wisconsin Legislative Session, two bills authored by Neylon have been passed and signed into law. These bills are Wisconsin Act 39 and the REINS Act. Wisconsin Act 39 provides that state agency scope statements, which are the first step in the administrative rule-making process, will expire after 30 months, if they are not acted upon. The REINS Act allows Wisconsin citizens more input into the rule-making process, and places the authority to approve rules with implementation costs of $10 million or more in the hands of elected legislators.  This law was the first of its kind to be passed by a state legislature.

Neylon, as chair of the Assembly Committee on Jobs and the Economy, helped guide the Foxconn Incentive Bill through the Assembly committee process. He also authored the substitute amendment to the bill that was adopted by the full Assembly. 
 
2017-18 Committee Assignments:
 Committee on Jobs and the Economy, Chairman
 Committee for Review of Administrative Rules, Vice-chair
 Committee on Energy and Utilities 
 Committee on Science and Technology
 Joint Committee for Review of Administrative Rules
 Small Business Regulatory Review Board, Co-chair
 100th Anniversary Capitol Commemorative Commission
 Speaker's Task Force on Foster Care
 Governor's Steering Committee on Autonomous and Connected Vehicle Testing and Deployment

References

1984 births
Living people
People from Elgin, Illinois
People from Pewaukee, Wisconsin
Carroll University alumni
Businesspeople from Wisconsin
Republican Party members of the Wisconsin State Assembly
21st-century American politicians
People from West Dundee, Illinois